Galfredus, Galfred or Geoffrey de Liberatione was Bishop of Dunkeld and Bishop-postulate of St Andrews. He was a clerk to King Alexander II of Scotland as early as 1219, as well as being a canon of Dunkeld and precentor of Glasgow. He was elected to the bishopric of Dunkeld in 1236. After an investigation by Pope Gregory IX regarding a defect of birth possessed by Galfred, he was confirmed as bishop in sometime in 1237.

In 1238, after the death of William de Malveisin, bishop of St Andrews, Geoffrey was postulated to that see. However, this postulation was disallowed by the Pope, and Geoffrey remained bishop of Dunkeld. Geoffrey was one of the bishops present at the coronation of King Alexander III in 1249. He died at Tippermuir on St Cecilia's Day (22 November) 1249. He was buried in the cathedral of Dunkeld.

References
Dowden, John, The Bishops of Scotland, ed. J. Maitland Thomson, (Glasgow, 1912)

1249 deaths
Bishops of Dunkeld (pre-Reformation)
Bishops of St Andrews
Clerks
13th-century Scottish Roman Catholic bishops
Burials at Dunkeld Cathedral
Year of birth unknown